Decoy is a 1934 German adventure film directed by Hans Steinhoff and starring Jakob Tiedtke, Viktor de Kowa, and Jessie Vihrog. A separate French-language version, The Decoy, was released the following year with a largely different cast.

The film's sets were designed by the art director Artur Günther and Fritz Maurischat. It was shot at the Babelsberg Studios and on location in Hamburg, Turkey and the North Sea.

Synopsis
A young man is commissioned by his jeweler father to take a valuable necklace from Istanbul to Marseille. While on the sea voyage he is targeted by a gang of thieves, using a beautiful woman as a decoy. He is eventually assisted by another woman who is secretly in love with him.

Cast
 Jakob Tiedtke as Juwelier Schott
 Viktor de Kowa as Schott junior
 Jessie Vihrog as Sibyl Termeer
 Fritz Rasp as de Groot, ihr Vormund
 Hilde Weissner as Delia Donovan
 Oskar Sima as Makarian
 Paul Westermeier as Robert, Kapitän
 Gerhard Bienert as 1. Offizier an Bord der 'Adrian Termeer'
 Hugo Fischer-Köppe as 2. Offizier an Bord der 'Adrian Termeer'
 Gertrud Wolle as Dame an Bord
 Hans Hermann Schaufuß as Herr an Bord
 Egon Brosig
 Josef Dahmen as Bandit
 Alfred Gerasch as Perser
 Inge Kadon as Perserin
 Sonja Krenzisky as Bumbawa
 Hede Mehrmann as Weisse Tänzerin
 Gustav Püttjer as Matrose
 Louis Ralph as Bandit
 Ernst Rotmund as Kriminallkommisar
 Werner Stock as Matrose

Criticism 
Karlheinz Wendtland confirmed that the film was "designed with speed and all the refinements". Furthermore, he was of the opinion that the film adaptation was not lacking in humor and that it was "completely apolitical despite the director Steinhoff".

References

Bibliography

External links 
 

1934 films
1934 adventure films
German adventure films
Films of Nazi Germany
1930s German-language films
Films directed by Hans Steinhoff
UFA GmbH films
Seafaring films
Films set in Istanbul
Films shot in Hamburg
Films shot at Babelsberg Studios
German multilingual films
German black-and-white films
1934 multilingual films
1930s German films